Conanicut Island Light (also known as Conanicut Island Lighthouse), built in 1886, is an inactive lighthouse in Jamestown, Rhode Island.

The light was built primarily to assist the ferry between Jamestown and Newport, Rhode Island. The lighthouse lies on the northern tip of Conanicut Island in Jamestown. The light was deactivated in 1933 and its lantern was removed. In 1934 it was sold as government surplus and is now a private residence. The lighthouse is listed on the National Register of Historic Places. It was featured in Wes Anderson's 2012 film Moonrise Kingdom.

See also
National Register of Historic Places listings in Newport County, Rhode Island

Notes
Lighthouse pics and info
 America's Atlantic Coast Lighthouses, Kenneth Kochel, Betken Publications; 2nd ed., 1996. 
 Northeast Lights: Lighthouses and Lightships, Rhode Island to Cape May, New Jersey, Robert Bachand, Sea Sports Publications. 1989. 
 "Conanicut Lighthouse, RI," George Worthylake, The Keeper's Log, Winter 2004.

References

Buildings and structures in Jamestown, Rhode Island
Lighthouses completed in 1886
Lighthouses in Newport County, Rhode Island
Lighthouses on the National Register of Historic Places in Rhode Island
National Register of Historic Places in Newport County, Rhode Island